The 1885 Wakanui by-election was a by-election held on 11 December 1885 in the  electorate during the 9th New Zealand Parliament.

The by-election was caused by the resignation of the incumbent MP John Grigg on 4 June 1885.

The by-election was won by Joseph Ivess.

Results
The following table gives the election result:

References

Wakanui 1885
1885 elections in New Zealand
Politics of Canterbury, New Zealand